The milkweed leaf beetle (Labidomera clivicollis) is a species of beetle from the family Chrysomelidae.

Description
L. clivicollis is a small, rounded beetle 8–11 mm in length. It has a black head and pronotum, but brightly coloured elytra; variable from dark orange to bright yellow. The elytra are mottled with black patches throughout. The larva of L. clivicollis is bright orange, with a prominent row of black spiracles.

Diet
There are a number of host plants associated with L. clivicollis: milkweeds, especially swamp milkweed (Asclepias incarnata) and common milkweed (A. syriaca); swallow-wort (Cynanchum); twinevine (Funastrum).

References

Chrysomelinae
Taxa named by William Kirby (entomologist)
Beetles described in 1837